The 1990 Valleydale Meats 500 was the sixth stock car race of the 1990 NASCAR Winston Cup Series season and the 30th iteration of the event. The race was held on Sunday, April 8, 1991, before an audience of 57,800 in Bristol, Tennessee, at Bristol Motor Speedway, a 0.533 miles (0.858 km) permanent oval-shaped racetrack. The race took the scheduled 500 laps to complete. To fill out the top three, Hendrick Motorsports driver Ricky Rudd would finish third.

Background 

The Bristol Motor Speedway, formerly known as Bristol International Raceway and Bristol Raceway, is a NASCAR short track venue located in Bristol, Tennessee. Constructed in 1960, it held its first NASCAR race on July 30, 1961. Despite its short length, Bristol is among the most popular tracks on the NASCAR schedule because of its distinct features, which include extraordinarily steep banking, an all concrete surface, two pit roads, and stadium-like seating. It has also been named one of the loudest NASCAR tracks.

Entry list 

 (R) denotes rookie driver.

Qualifying 
Qualifying was originally scheduled to be split into two rounds. The first round was scheduled to be held on Friday, April 6, at 4:00 PM EST. However, due to rain, the first round was cancelled, and qualifying was condensed into one round, which was held on Saturday, April 7, at 1:00 PM EST. Each driver would have one lap to set a time. For this specific race, positions 1–30 would be decided on time, and depending on who needed it, a select amount of positions were given to cars who had not otherwise qualified but were high enough in owner's points; up to two provisionals were given.

Two drivers would fail to qualify.

Full qualifying results

Race results

Standings after the race 

Drivers' Championship standings

Note: Only the first 10 positions are included for the driver standings.

References 

1990 NASCAR Winston Cup Series
NASCAR races at Bristol Motor Speedway
April 1990 sports events in the United States
1990 in sports in Tennessee